The Female Animal is a 1958 American CinemaScope film noir drama film directed by Harry Keller  and starring Hedy Lamarr, Jane Powell, Jan Sterling and George Nader.

Although she lived until 2000, this was Lamarr's final film in a film career of nearly 30 years.

Plot
Movie star Vanessa Windsor is nearly struck by a camera on the set, saved at the last second by Chris Farley, a handsome extra. A cut on his arm is attended to and Vanessa invites him to dinner at her Malibu beach home, where she clearly has designs on him for a night of romance.

Their evening is interrupted by a message that Vanessa's grown daughter, Penny, is sick. Vanessa rushes to her only to find her drunk. Penny then accuses her mother of adopting her simply for the publicity.

Vanessa decides to offer Chris a job as caretaker for the beach house. He is considering an offer from a friend, Hank Lopez, to shoot a film in Mexico, but the job pays nothing, so Chris accepts Vanessa's offer instead. In time, they become lovers as well.

Not knowing who she is, Chris comes upon Penny being physically manhandled by a date. Chris punches the man and takes a tipsy Penny back to the beach house. She doesn't indicate any recognition of the home as her mother's. Penny is so drunk that Chris places her under a shower, whereupon she kisses him.

Vanessa begins having Chris as her escort in public, but endures disapproving looks as well as snide remarks from Lily Frayne, another aging actress out with a younger man. Chris starts to resent being a kept man. Although Penny reveals her true identity to him, they end up having an affair. Chris decides to bail out of the threesome by agreeing to shoot the movie in Mexico, but Vanessa merely sees this as an opportunity for a publicity stunt marriage in Mexico. Chris again tries to end the relationship but still keeps Vanessa in the dark about the identity of her love rival.

When she's shooting a dangerous scene and while being "drunk again", Vanessa sees Chris and Penny standing together on the set and finally realises that they are having an affair. She takes a dangerous plunge into a water pool, a scene that was supposed to have been performed by her stunt woman. Chris rescues her again; in the final scene, she tells him "it wouldn't have worked anyway" and then sobs into her pillow.

Cast
 Hedy Lamarr as Vanessa Windsor
 Jane Powell as Penny Windsor 
 Jan Sterling as Lily Frayne
 George Nader as Chris Farley
 Jerry Paris as Hank Galvez (not Lopez)
 Gregg Palmer as Piggy 
 Mabel Albertson as Irma Jones
 James Gleason as Tom Maloney
 Richard H. Cutting as Mr. John Ramsay 
 Ann Doran as Nurse
 Yvonne Peattie as Hairdresser 
 Max Showalter as Charlie Grant (as Casey Adams)
 Douglas Evans as Al The Director 
 Aram Katcher as Mischa Boroff

Production notes
The Female Animal was the "A" picture that was distributed as a double-bill with the "B" picture being Orson Welles's Touch of Evil.

The tagline for the movie was "It is said that when a woman fights for a man, she is like an ANIMAL!".

The "aging actress" (Hedy Lamarr) was 44, her youthful lover (George Nader) 38 and her precocious daughter (Jane Powell) 29 when the movie was shot.

External links

1958 films
Film noir
1958 drama films
American drama films
Films directed by Harry Keller
Films scored by Hans J. Salter
1950s English-language films
1950s American films